Legislative elections were held in Kazakhstan on 7 March 1994, alongside local elections. The People's Union of Kazakhstan Unity emerged as the largest party with 33 of the 177 seats, although 64 independents were also elected. Supporters of the President won a clear majority of seats, and around 60% of seats were won by ethnic Kazakhs. Following the elections, Sergey Tereshchenko was reappointed Prime Minister. Voter turnout was 73.5%.

Background
The elections were the first to the Supreme Kenges created by the 1993 constitution; elections for the former 360-seat Supreme Soviet had last taken place in March 1990, prior to independence in December 1991. The outgoing Supreme Soviet dissolved itself on 13 December 1993, five days after having set the election date.

Campaign
The President's People's Union of Kazakhstan Unity was challenged by several newly formed groups, especially the People's Congress of Kazakhstan. After a screening process, 754 candidates were approved to contest the 135 directly-elected seats. There were also 65 candidates for the 42 "state list" seats.

The campaign lasted two-months and was focussed on the economy; Nazarbayev committed to the free-market system and continuing reforms, particularly in the banking and tax spheres, in order to attract foreign investment.

Conduct
The elections were monitored by foreign observers, including the CSCE. The CSCE report called into question whether the elections had been free and fair.

Results

References

External links
Inter-Parliamentary Union Report on 1994 Kazakhstan Elections
Parliament of Republic of Kazakhstan
Central Election Commission

Kazakhstan
Legislative
Elections in Kazakhstan
Annulled elections
Election and referendum articles with incomplete results